Robert Kuok Hock Nien (Hokchew: Guoh24 Houk5 Nieng55; born 6 October 1923), is a Malaysian business magnate and investor. Since 1973, Kuok has lived in Hong Kong. According to Forbes, his net worth is estimated at $12.6 billion as of April 2021, making him the wealthiest Malaysian and 104th wealthiest person in the world. As of April 2019, according to the Bloomberg Billionaires Index, Kuok has an estimated net worth of $18.4 billion, making him the 53rd richest person in the world.

Kuok is media-shy; most of his businesses are privately held by him or his family. Apart from a multitude of businesses in Malaysia, his companies have investments in many countries throughout Asia. His business interests (collectively known as the Kuok Group of Companies) range from sugarcane plantations (Perlis Plantations Bhd), sugar refineries, flour milling, animal feed, oil, mining, finance, hotel (Shangri-La Hotels and Resorts), property (Kerry Properties), trading, freight (Kerry Logistics) and publishing. His biggest source of wealth is a stake in Wilmar International, the world's largest listed palm oil trader company.

In 2018, Kuok was appointed to the Council of Eminent Persons to advise then-Prime Minister Mahathir Mohamad.

Early life and education
Kuok was born on 6 October 1923 in Johor Bahru to a Malaysian Chinese family. Kuok's father Kuok Keng Kang arrived in Malaya from Fuzhou, China, at the beginning of the 20th century, and Robert was the youngest of three brothers born to Kuok Keng Kang and Robert's mother Zheng Ge Ru. He grew up speaking his parents' Fuzhou dialect, English and Japanese during Japan's wartime occupation of Malaya. He studied at Raffles Institution (where he was classmates with Lee Kuan Yew) and English College Johore Bahru.

Career and business
According to Kuok himself, he began in business as an office boy, and later started a business with relatives' support. Upon graduation, he became a collaborator and worked as a clerk in the rice-trading department of Japanese industrial conglomerate Mitsubishi Shoji Kaisha during the Japanese occupation period between 1942 and 1945, in Singapore, a conglomerate that with the help of Japanese military unit monopolized the rice trade in Malaya during the occupation period. He was soon promoted to head the rice-trading department. After the war, he took the skills he learned from the occupying force to the family's business in Johor.

After the senior Kuok died in 1948, Kuok and his two brothers and a cousin, Kuok Hock Chin founded Kuok Brothers Sdn Bhd in 1949, trading agricultural commodities. Kuok's relationship with the Japanese continued after Malaya gained independence. In 1959, Kuok formed Malayan Sugar Manufacturing Co. Bhd. together with two prominent Japanese partners. He also brought many influential Malay elites into his company as directors and shareholders, including politicians and royalty. In 1961, he bought cheap sugar from India before the prices shot up, and continued to invest heavily in sugar refineries, at one time controlling 80% of the Malaysian sugar market with production of 1.5 million tonnes, equivalent to 10% of world production, earning himself the nickname "Sugar King of Asia".

In 1971, he built the first Shangri-La Hotel in Singapore; with land acquired through Petaling Garden Berhad, a Malaysian based developer. His first foray into Hong Kong property was in 1977, when he acquired a plot of land on the newly reclaimed Tsim Sha Tsui East waterfront, where he built his second hotel, the Kowloon Shangri-La. In 1993, his Kerry Group acquired a 34.9% stake in the South China Morning Post from Murdoch's News Corporation. Kuok officially retired from the Kerry Group on 1 April 1993.

His companies have investments in many countries, including Singapore, the Philippines, Thailand, Mainland China, Indonesia, Fiji, and Australia. Businesses in China include 10 bottling companies for Coca-Cola and ownership of the Beijing World Trade Centre.

Freight interests include Malaysian Bulk Carriers Berhad and Transmile Group.

In 2007, Kuok combined his plantations, edible oil, and grains businesses with Wilmar International, making it the world's biggest palm-oil processor.

On 31 October 2009, PPB Group under the flagship of Robert Kuok issued a statement to the Bursa Malaysia that it had decided to dispose of its sugar units along with land used to cultivate sugar cane for RM 1.29 billion to FELDA. The sales resulted in a one-off gain for the company.

In February 2014, Kuok's Singapore-based oil services company PACC Offshore Services Holdings (POSH) started pre-IPO talks with investors to list on the Singapore Stock Exchange to raise $400 million.

Politics
His political influence is attested by his selection as one of the Hong Kong Affairs Advisors in the run-up to the transfer of sovereignty of Hong Kong, and his minority stake in CITIC Pacific. He was also instrumental in conveying information and setting up the meetings between Malaysian and Chinese governments leading to full diplomatic cross recognition of the two countries.

On 12 May 2018, in the aftermath of the Malaysian general election that year, Kuok was appointed to the five-member Council of Eminent Persons along with Tun Daim Zainuddin, Tan Sri Datuk Seri Zeti Akhtar Aziz, Tan Sri Hassan Marican and Jomo Kwame Sundaram to advise the new Pakatan Harapan federal government.

Personal life
Kuok has been married twice. His first wife was Joyce Cheah and his second wife is Pauline Ho Poh Lin. He has eight children from the marriages. His son, Kuok Khoon Ean born in 1955 married Kuok Cheng Sui and holds a bachelor's degree in Economics from the University of Nottingham, England. His other son, Kuok Khoon Ho is the chairman of Kuok Brothers, born in 1951 and holds a bachelor's degree from McGill University, Canada. Kuok Hui Kwong, his daughter, is the managing director and chief executive of SCMP Group and chairperson of Shangri-La Asia. One of his sons, Kuok Khoon Ean, handles most of the day-to-day operations of his businesses. He currently resides in Kuala Lumpur.

Kuok's brother, Philip Kuok Hock Khee was a former Malaysian Ambassador to Germany, Yugoslavia, Netherlands, Belgium, Luxembourg and Denmark. Philip married Eileen Kuok and had two sons and two daughters. Philip Kuok died in 2003. Another brother, William Kuok Hock Ling, was a member of the Malayan Communist Party and was killed during the Malayan Emergency in 1952. According to his memoir, Kuok described that of all the brothers, his mother Zheng Ge Ru doted on and adored William the most, and was heartbroken when she received news of William's death.

His nephew, Kuok Khoon Hong is the chairman of Wilmar International, and one of the richest people in Singapore. Kuok Khoon Hong's father, Kuok Hock Swee, was an older cousin of Robert Kuok.

His grand-nephew, Kuok Meng Ru, is in the music retail industry, owning Swee Lee music company.

Kuok is a follower of Buddhism. He lives in the Deep Water Bay neighbourhood on Hong Kong Island.

Bibliography
In March 2018, Kuok published a book about his life entitled, Robert Kuok: A Memoir. It won Best Book of the Year at the Singapore Book Publishers Association awards 2018.
 Robert Kuok: A Memoir (2018)

References

External links

1923 births
Living people
20th-century Malaysian businesspeople
21st-century Malaysian businesspeople
21st-century philanthropists
Giving Pledgers
Malaysian people of Chinese descent
Malaysian Buddhists
Malaysian businesspeople
Malaysian billionaires
Malaysian chairpersons of corporations
Malaysian chief executives
Malaysian company founders
Malaysian investors
Members of the Preparatory Committee for the Hong Kong Special Administrative Region
Hong Kong Affairs Advisors
Kerry Group
Raffles Institution alumni
Palm oil production in Malaysia
Robert Kuok